The sooty grassquit (Asemospiza fuliginosa) is a small bird. It is recognized as a tanager closely related to Darwins finches.

It is found in Argentina, Bolivia, Brazil, Colombia, Guyana, Paraguay, Trinidad and Tobago, and Venezuela. Its natural habitats are subtropical or tropical moist lowland forest, subtropical or tropical moist montane forest, subtropical or tropical dry shrubland, and heavily degraded former forest.

References

sooty grassquit
Birds of the Venezuelan Coastal Range
Birds of Trinidad and Tobago
Birds of Brazil
Birds of the Atlantic Forest
Birds of the Caribbean
sooty grassquit
Taxa named by Prince Maximilian of Wied-Neuwied
Taxonomy articles created by Polbot